Pierre-François "David" Beauchard (born 9 February 1959), also known by the pen name David B., is a French comic book artist and writer, and one of the founders of .

Biography
After studying advertising at the Duperré School of Applied Arts in Paris, Beauchard began working in comics in 1985 (Pas de samba pour capitaine Tonnerre), and wrote and illustrated stories in numerous magazines, including Okapi, À suivre, Tintin Reporter, and Chic. His distinctive black-and-white style was influenced by Georges Pichard and Jacques Tardi, among others.

In 1990, he co-founded the independent publisher L'Association, which became a major force in French small-press comics. His comics appeared in the L'Association anthology magazine Lapin and in numerous small-format books. Much of his work in the 1990s was dream art, collected in le Cheval blême and les Incidents de la nuit.

From 1996 to 2003, he created the acclaimed six-volume autobiographical epic l'Ascension du Haut Mal (meaning, literally, "The Rise of the High Evil" but published in English as Epileptic, "haut mal" indicating what is referred to in English as a grand mal seizure). It was the first of his long works to be translated into English, and is now considered to be among the masterpieces of recent Franco-Belgian comics. The series has been repeatedly nominated for prizes at the Angoulême International Comics Festival : in 2002, the fourth volume received the Angoulême International Comics Festival Prize for Scenario and in 1998 and in 2004, volumes 2 and 6 were nominated for the Prize for Best Comic Book.

Since 1997, he has also worked for publishers other than L'Association, and has collaborated with other authors such as Joann Sfar, Christophe Blain, and Emmanuel Guibert.

In 1998, he was named European Cartoonist of the year by The Comics Journal.

In 2005 Beauchard was awarded the Ignatz Award for Outstanding Artist.

With historical assistance by Jean-Pierre Filiu, Beauchard published the 2012 graphic novel Best of Enemies: A History of US and Middle East Relations through SelfMadeHero. It was translated to English by Edward Gauvin.

Bibliography
 le Timbre maudit (Bayard Presse, 1986)
 les Leçons du nourrisson savant (Le Seuil, 1990)
 les Leçons du nourrisson savant (1990)
 le Nourrisson savant et ses parents (1990)
 le Cheval blême (L'Association, 1992)
 le Cercueil de course (L'Association, 1993)
 le Livre somnambule (Automne 67, 1994)
 le Messie discret in le Retour de Dieu (Autrement, 1994)
 le Nain jaune (Cornélius, 1993–1994)
 Tome 1 (1993)
 Tome 2 (1993)
 Tome 3 (1994)
 Tome 4 (1994)
 Tome 5 (1994)
 la Bombe familiale (L'Association, 1997) 
 le Tengû carré (Dargaud, 1997) 
 les 4 Savants (Cornélius, 1996–1998)
 le Démon à tête d'entrailles (1996)
 la Circonvolution de la peur (1997)
 le Paradis terrestre (1998)
 L'Association en Égypte (with Golo, Edmond Baudoin, Jean-Christophe Menu) (L'Association, 1998)
 Maman a des problèmes (with Anne Baraou) (L'Association, 1999)
 Hiram Lowatt et Placido (with Christophe Blain) (Dargaud, 2000)
 la Révolte de Hop-Frog (2000)
 les Ogres (2000)
 la Ville des mauvais rêves (with Joann Sfar) (Dargaud, 2000)
 Urani (2000) 
 le Capitaine écarlate (with Emmanuel Guibert) (Dupuis, 2000) 
 la Lecture des ruines (Dupuis, 2001)
 les Incidents de la nuit (L'Association, 1999–2002)
 Tome 1 (1999)
 les Traces du dieu Enn (2000)
 l'Embuscade (2002)
 l'Ascension du Haut Mal (Epileptic) (L'Association, 1996–2003)
 Tome 1 (1996) 
 Tome 2 (1997) 
 Tome 3 (1998) 
 Tome 4 (1999) 
 Tome 5 (2000) 
 Tome 6 (2003) 
 les Chercheurs de trésors (Dargaud, 2003–2004)
 l'Ombre de Dieu (2003) 
 la Ville froide (2004) 
 Babel (Coconino Press, 2004)
 Tome 1 (2004)
 Tome 2 (2006)
 les Complots nocturnes (Futuropolis, 2005)
 Zèbre (Tartamudo, 2005)
 le Jardin armé et autres histoires (Futuropolis, 2006)
 2 Rêves (Brüsel, 2007)
 Par les chemins noirs (Futuropolis, 2007)
 Journal d'Italie 1, Trieste-Bologne (2010)
 Best of Enemies: A History of US and Middle East Relations (SelfMadeHero, 2012)

Awards
 2000: Angoulême Festival, Prize for Scenario, for L'ascension du Haut Mal Tome 4
 2005: Ignatz Award, Outstanding Artist, for Epileptic

Notes

References

 David Beauchard publications in (A SUIVRE) BDoubliées 
 David Beauchard at Bedetheque

External links
 
 David Beauchard biography on Lambiek Comiclopedia

1959 births
French comics artists
French comics writers
Living people
People from Nîmes
Comic book letterers
Ignatz Award winners for Outstanding Artist
French male novelists
French graphic novelists
Weird fiction writers